Royal Air Force Booker or more simply RAF Booker is a former Royal Air Force installation located  south west of High Wycombe, Buckinghamshire and  north east of Henley-on-Thames, Oxfordshire, England.

Booker was opened as a flying training school in 1941 on the site of a civilian flying school requisitioned and closed on the outbreak of war in 1939.

In 1965 the site was taken over by Airways Aero Associations (now the Airways Flying Club), who have operated the airfield as an increasingly commercial training and recreational field, now called Wycombe Air Park.  Booker featured in many of the airfield scenes in the 1965 feature film Those Magnificent Men in their Flying Machines.

History
RAF Booker was opened as the home of No. 21 Elementary Flying Training School RAF in 1941. The flying school operated 72 de Havilland Tiger Moths and Miles Magisters. No. 21 EFTS trained 120 pupils on a seven-week course - later to become 11 weeks.

In May 1942, training was also started on the airfield for the Glider Pilot Regiment.

In 1950, the University of London Air Squadron (ULAS) resumed flying out of Booker, and it also temporarily hosted the Manchester and Liverpool University Squadrons.

In 1955, a hard runway (made of 90 feet wide pierced steel planking) was added to the four wartime grass runways.

From 1956, part of the facilities, including a hangar, were used for accommodation and annual training of Air Training Corps staff of Warrant Officer rank.  This week of training was an intense course in gaining a deeper understanding of duties and of the modern requirements of an ever-improving service.

During the Cold War the Director UKWMO was located at the United Kingdom Regional Air Operations Command (UK RAOC) at RAF Booker tasked with instigating the national four-minute air raid warnings.

The RAF continued to base its Bomber Command Communications Flight RAF at RAF Booker until 1963 (in close proximity to other Bomber Command stations nearby, such as RAF Daws Hill).

In 1965, the airfield became privately run, and is now Wycombe Air Park.

See also
 List of former Royal Air Force stations

References

External links

Airports in England
Royal Air Force stations in Buckinghamshire
History of Buckinghamshire
Royal Air Force stations of World War II in the United Kingdom